Aleksandr Mishchenko (born 30 July 1997) is a Kyrgyzstani footballer who plays for Dordoi Bishkek in the Kyrgyzstan League and Kyrgyzstan national football team as a defender.

Career

Club

International
Mishchenko made his debut for Kyrgyzstan national football team in a friendly match on 11 June 2019 against Palestine.

Career statistics

International
Statistics accurate as of match played 29 March 2022

Honours
Dordoi Bishkek
Kyrgyz Premier League: 2018, 2019, 2020, 2021
 Kyrgyzstan Cup: 2017, 2018
 Kyrgyzstan Super Cup: 2019, 2021

References

External links

1997 births
Living people
People from Chüy Region
Kyrgyzstan international footballers
Kyrgyzstani footballers
FC Dordoi Bishkek players
Association football defenders
Kyrgyzstani people of Russian descent
German people of Russian descent
German people of Kyrgyzstani descent